The Freedom Party of Ontario (FPO) is a provincial political party in Ontario, Canada. It was founded on January 1, 1984, in London, Ontario by Robert Metz and Marc Emery. The Freedom Party has fielded candidates in every provincial election since 1985, and in several by-elections. It has also participated in numerous public policy debates, often on contentious social issues.

In 1980 a schism occurred in the libertarian movement in Ontario, with several members of the Libertarian Party, unhappy with its direction and democratic structure, left to follow the Objectivist Unparty. In 1984, the Unparty changed its name to the Freedom Party of Ontario.

Ideology
The Freedom Party's founding principle is that "every individual, in the peaceful pursuit of personal fulfillment, has an absolute right to his or her own life, liberty, and property." The Freedom Party membership's stated objectives are four-fold: encouraging voters to vote for FPO candidates in provincial elections and by-elections, influencing government through the election of FPO candidates to the Ontario legislature, protecting every Ontarian's right to life, liberty and property, and lastly building and supporting the FPO by becoming a network of individuals dedicated to carrying out the aforementioned principles, described in detail above.

The party has, from its inception in 1984, explained that "the Freedom Party believes that the purpose of government is to protect our freedom of choice, not to restrict it."  The party advocates government that takes into account only claims backed by evidence.  It submits that all government laws and decisions must be logical, and must at all times serve the purpose of ensuring that no person's life, liberty, or property is taken without his consent.

History

Founding

The Freedom Party of Ontario was founded by a number of people based in the London, Ontario area, including Robert Metz and Marc Emery of London, who had founded The London Tribune (a broadsheet daily newspaper) in London in 1980  and, later published the London Metrobulletin (beginning in March 1983).  Toward the end of 1983, Metz assumed the registration of the Toronto-based Unparty which folded and closed its Toronto office.  Elections Ontario approved the party's name change on October 19, 1983.  Because Metz and Emery were turning their attention to electoral politics, the final issue of the London Metrobulletin was published in December 1983.  Freedom Party of Ontario was officially launched on January 1, 1984, with its head office in London.  Freedom Party of Ontario's founding platform was summarized in the statement: "Freedom Party believes that the purpose of government is to protect our freedom of choice, not to restrict it."

1984–2002
The FPO was best known during the 1980s for its campaigns against censorship and provincial laws that restricted Sunday shopping. Robert Metz, the party's first president, spoke for the FPO in 1987 when he argued that the Sunday shopping debate was fundamentally about freedom of choice for the retailer and consumer.  Leading FPO members also opposed legal restrictions on pornography that depicts consensual sex between consenting adults, and opposed the prohibition of marijuana, arguing that the state did not have the right to legislate in such matters.

On economic issues, the FPO supported tax reductions and opposed provincial welfare programs. It was also critical of the Ontario Human Rights Commission and of affirmative action programs.  Some prominent former members of Voice of Canadians (VOC), a now-defunct group that opposed official multiculturalism and official bilingualism, have affiliated with the FPO since the 1990s.

Metz became the first leader of the party in 1987, and served until 1994 when he was replaced by Jack Plant. Plant stepped down in 1997, and was replaced by Lloyd Walker. All of the party's leaders between 1987 and 2002 were from London, and the party's activities were organized primarily from that city. The party newsletter, Freedom Flyer, was published on an occasional basis, and back copies are available online.

The Freedom Party has opposed government restrictions on free speech and freedom of expression throughout its existence, arguing that the state has no right to intervene except in cases of fraud, defamation, or the commission of crimes such as sex with children. Marc Emery frequently challenged Canada's censorship laws during his years as an FPO organizer, via the private bookstore he operated in London.  He continued to do so after resigning from FPO in 1990.

The FPO took a civil libertarian stance on hate speech and the rights of individuals to express political opinions, whether those opinions are rational or irrational, unoffensive or offensive, popular or unpopular. In 1999, the London police wrote to Raphael Bergmann and Tyler Chilcott alleging that they were members of the Northern Alliance.  The letter stated that, as they belonged to an "extreme right-wing" group they were "required" to report to the police to explain their opinions. The FPO's then leader, Lloyd Walker requested that Solicitor-General David Tsubouchi provide a list of "extreme" political beliefs that could result in such police action. No response was provided by the government, and nothing more came of the matter. here. Bergmann and Chilcott were never FPO members and the party did not support their views, simply their right to express them.

Since 2002 under leadership of Paul McKeever
The party was partly restructured in 2002, when Oshawa lawyer Paul McKeever replaced Walker as party leader. McKeever argues that the FPO is now targeted toward building an electoral base and that a new organization, Freedom Party International, has taken on its prior advocacy role. FPI now publishes the former FPO journal, Consent.

McKeever (born 1966) has been the party's leader since 2002. He graduated from Trent University with an Honours Bachelor of Science in 1989 and a Master of Arts from the University of Western Ontario in 1991 and a law degree from the same university in 1995.  He currently practises civil litigation and employment law.

McKeever became a member of the Freedom Party of Ontario in 1992, joined its executive in 1999, and became party leader in 2002 following the resignation of Lloyd Walker. He is the party's first leader not to reside in London, Ontario.  McKeever is also owner and operator of the "Mondo Politico" website, which reviews the political positions of various parties, including his own.

McKeever was a candidate for the Freedom Party of Ontario in the 1999 election in Toronto Centre-Rosedale, where he received 344 votes, or 0.8% of all votes cast. In the 2003 provincial in the riding of Oshawa, he came in fifth out of six candidates with 518 votes or 1.3% of all votes cast. McKeever was the Freedom Party's candidate in the March 30, 2006 Whitby—Ajax by-election and received 198 votes, 0.6% of all ballots cast. During the 2007 provincial election McKeever ran in London West where he received 234 votes, 0.5% of all ballots cast. He was a candidate in the September 17, 2009 provincial by-election in the Toronto riding of St. Paul's and received 61 votes (0.2%).

Under McKeever's leadership, the Freedom Party of Ontario nominated 24 candidates in the 2003 provincial election and 15 candidates in the 2007 provincial election. 56 Freedom Party candidates contested the 2011 provincial election and 42 Freedom Party candidates contested the 2014 provincial election. The Freedom Party of Canada has not nominated any candidates in federal elections.

The FPO promoted an electoral platform entitled "The Right Direction" for the 2003 election, arguing that with the PCs turning away from Mike Harris's Common Sense Revolution, the FPO was the only remaining party with "common sense".

On October 4, 2005, the FPO released its 2007 election platform. It focused on competition in health care and education, repealing price controls on electricity, the replacement of property taxes with consumption taxes, and the elimination of the provincial income tax.

The party failed to win any seats in the 2022 Ontario general election.

Other Freedom parties
The FPO is affiliated with the Freedom Party of Canada (FPC), an unregistered political party which was founded by Paul McKeever and Robert Metz on July 20, 2001. It is also affiliated with Freedom Party International, which is not a political party but an organization founded to advocate and promote the party's philosophy, and to serve as the authority that must be consulted by any persons wishing to form an affiliated political party. FPO, FPC, FPUSA and FPI are not affiliated with the Freedom Party of British Columbia, the Freedom Party of Manitoba or other parties styled as "Freedom Party".

Election results

 March 31, 1988 provincial by-election – London North, 548 votes (1.7%), fifth of six candidates
 November 3, 1988 provincial by-election – Welland—Thorold, 260 votes (0.9%), fourth of five candidates
 April 1, 1993 provincial by-election – Don Mills, 161 votes (0.9%), seventh of eight candidates
 November 24, 2005 provincial by-election – Scarborough—Rouge River, 59 votes (0.4%), sixth of six candidates.
 March 31, 2006 provincial by-elections:
 Toronto—Danforth, 93 votes, (0.3%), sixth of nine candidates
 Whitby—Ajax, 198 votes, (0.6%), fifth of seven candidates (FpO candidate was party leader Paul McKeever)
 Nepean—Carleton, 74 votes, (0.2%), sixth of six candidates
 September 14, 2006 provincial by-election – Parkdale—High Park, 111 votes (0.4%), seventh of eight candidates
 September 6, 2012 provincial by-elections:
 Vaughan, 90 votes (0.3%), eighth out of nine candidates.
 Kitchener—Waterloo, 95 votes (0.2%), sixth out of ten candidates.
 August 1, 2013 provincial by-elections:
 Scarborough—Guildwood (Matthew Oliver), 80 votes (0.3%), ninth out of ten candidates
 Etobicoke—Lakeshore (Wayne Simmons), 57 votes (0.2%), last out of eight candidates
 Ottawa South (Dave McGruer), 85 votes (0.2%), eighth out of nine candidates
 Windsor—Tecumseh (Andrew Brannan), 124 votes (0.5%), last out of seven candidates
 London West (Al Gretzky), 1,838 votes (5.0%), fourth out of six candidates

Party leaders
 Robert Metz (1987–1994)
 Jack Plant (1994–1997)
 Lloyd Walker (1997–2002)
 Paul McKeever (2002–)

(Note: The party did not have an official leader from 1984 to 1987. Robert Metz was its president during this period. Lloyd Walker was initially chosen as leader on an interim basis.)

See also

 List of Ontario general elections
 List of Ontario political parties
 List of libertarian political parties
 Freedom Party of Ontario candidates, 1995 Ontario provincial election
 Freedom Party of Ontario candidates, 2003 Ontario provincial election

Footnotes

External links
 

Provincial political parties in Ontario
Political parties established in 1984
Organizations based in London, Ontario
1984 establishments in Ontario
Objectivist organizations
Libertarian parties